Aulana is a genus of flies in the family Stratiomyidae.

Species
Aulana confirmata Walker, 1864
Aulana cyrtaspis Kertész, 1908
Aulana insularis James, 1939
Aulana sumatrana (Meijere, 1916)

References

Stratiomyidae
Brachycera genera
Taxa named by Francis Walker (entomologist)
Diptera of Asia